Castle Peak may refer to:

Mountains
 Castle Peak (Alaska), Wrangell Mountains
 Castle Peak (California), Sierra Nevada range
 Castle Peak (Colorado), Elk Mountains
 Castle Peak (Sawatch Range), Sawatch Range, Colorado
 Castle Peak (Idaho), White Cloud Mountains, Idaho
 Castle Peak (Texas)
 Castle Peak (Washington), North Cascades
 Castle Peak (Hong Kong) (sometimes transliterated Tsing Shan), a mountain in the western New Territories of Hong Kong
 Castle Peak Bay (青山灣), a bay outside Tuen Mun, near Castle Peak, Hong Kong
 Castle Peak Beach (青山灣泳灘), a gazetted beach in Tuen Mun, Hong Kong
 Castle Peak Hospital (青山醫院), a psychiatric hospital in Hong Kong, to the east of Castle Peak at Tuen Mun
 Castle Peak Road (青山道 and 青山公路), a road in Hong Kong running north from Kowloon
 Tsing Shan Monastery (青山禪院), a monastery at the foot of Castle Peak, Hong Kong
 Castle Peak (Antarctica)

Other uses
 Castle Peak, in El Escorpión Park, San Fernando Valley, California
 AMD Castle Peak, CPUs of the Zen 2 Threadripper line by Advanced Micro Devices